Ramy Romany is an Egyptologist, Documentarian, TV Host and DGA Director.  He has filmed, produced, directed, and been featured in over a hundred documentaries, and has worked with networks such as The Discovery Channel, The History Channel, and National Geographic.

Biography 

Romany was born in Cairo, Egypt.  He moved to Los Angeles, CA, in 2011 when he left the political situation in Egypt. Between 2013 and 2018 he won 9 EMMY Awards for his work on Esperanza (2013), Visioneer (2015), Return to Esperanza  (2016), A New Leash on Life: The K9s for Warriors Story (2018), and Rudy Ruettiger: The Walk On (2018). Romany has directed multiple productions in different genres, including: The Contender, a boxing competition series for MGM on EPIX; Unprotected Sets; Operation Toussaint, which follows a former U.S. special agent who goes undercover to rescue victims of sex trafficking; and several commercials.

While working on The Contender, Romany, colorist Dean Perme, and Jason Hafer created a custom 3D LUT to give the show a “period feel that felt like film,” which supported the cinematic approach that Romany took with his directing.

In March 2019, it was announced that Romany would serve as executive producer and host of the new Discovery Channel series Mummies Unwrapped. The series featured Romany traveling to ancient Egyptian tombs, Mayan mass graves, and hidden crypts to uncover the legends, myths, curses and cover-ups of the ancient past. He used cutting-edge technologies to introduce new theories about how ancient civilizations lived and died, and to uncover the origin of each mummy.

Works (TV, film, and books) 

 "Making The Cut" for Amazon Network
 Destination Truth for the SyFy Network
 Conspired: The Evil One Shall Not Live Again
 Brew Masters for The Discovery Channel
 Ancient Aliens for The History Channel
 What Lies Beneath for BBC TV
 Long Way Down for National Geographic
 The Contender for MGM on EPIX
 Operation Toussaint  for Amazon Prime
 Expedition Unknown: Egypt Live for The Discovery Channel
 Mummies Unwrapped for the Discovery Channel
 Unprotected Sets  for MGM on EPIX
 Esperanza
 Visioneer
 Return to Esperanza
 A New Leash on Life: The K9s for Warriors Story
 Rudy Ruettiger: The Walk On
Patterns of Evidence

References

External links
 Official Website

Living people
Film directors from Los Angeles
American documentary film directors
Year of birth missing (living people)